Albemarle Hotel (also known as Albemarle House; alternate spelling Albermarle) was located at 1101 Broadway (also addressed as 1 West 24th Street) in the Flatiron District of Manhattan, New York City. Built in 1860 and overlooking Madison Square, it was one of the largest hotels on the avenue in its day.

History

Albemarle Hotel was located in New York City at the junction of Broadway, Fifth Avenue, and 24th Street, facing Madison Square. 
Its location was convenient to theatres, churches, halls, clubs, and retail stores. It was opened by George D. Ives in 1860. Proprietors included Louis H. Janvrin and Henry Walter (d. 1903) who refitted and furnished it. The culinary department was under the management of a French chef, and the cuisine included the rarest of everything that the markets provided.

Architecture and fittings
The hotel was built of white marble, six stories in height. The interior appointments were luxurious. The plumbing and sanitary arrangements were under the supervision of the sanitary engineer, Charles T. Wingate. The offices, reception and dining rooms were frescoed and decorated, and connected with the floors above by spacious staircases and a safety passenger elevator. The accommodations served upwards of 150 guests. Many of the rooms were en suite, affording parlor, bedrooms and bathroom, all self-contained and luxuriously furnished. Many of these suites were permanently occupied by wealthy citizens. The Albemarle's halls and corridors were wide, while the rooms were handsomely furnished and elegant in their appointments, fixtures and upholstery.

Demolition
The hotel closed in the mid-1910s and along with the adjacent Hoffman House was replaced with a sixteen-story building in 1915.

References

Bibliography

External links

Defunct hotels in Manhattan
1860 establishments in New York (state)
Buildings and structures demolished in 1915
Broadway (Manhattan)
Flatiron District
Demolished buildings and structures in Manhattan